= Ulysses "Seen" =

The Ulysses "Seen" project uses a digital comics adaptation of James Joyce’s 1922 novel Ulysses as a gateway to comprehension, exploration, and explication of the great novel. Using a patent-pending digital screen structure, the comic provides an organizing principle for other kinds of content (including and especially various learning resources) by layering that content behind each page of the comic. In addition to minimizing the disruption to narrative posed by traditional footnotes and endnotes, the layering structure serves an intuitive indexing function as well, providing a searchable concordance for general readers, students and scholars. Although the project began life as a web-based platform, the project has been praised for its ability to leverage the functionality of tablet devices in delivering visual content in a way that makes the deeper forms of content readily accessible.

The project currently consists of three layers—the comic, a Reader’s Guide, and a user comment section. A fourth layer, consisting of the full text of the novel with links to scholarly resources embedded in hypertext links, is in development.

The Ulysses "Seen" project has attracted the attention of the academic, technology, and popular culture communities. At the 2013 International James Joyce Symposium, Melissa Higgins presented a paper “Ulysses ‘Seen’: Re-visioning Modernism in the Digital Turn,” and the project was discussed in several other presentations. The project has been profiled in numerous online publications and blogs, such as the Huffington Post and OpenCulture, and was the subject of a local PBS program highlighting arts initiatives.

The project’s notoriety has led to collaboration with the James Joyce Center in Dublin, Ireland, where the project serves as a “front door” to the Center’s Ulysses-related programs—.

The Ulysses "Seen" project is produced by Throwaway Horse LLC, a Pennsylvania-based limited liability company, which owns the copyright in the comic and Reader’s Guide content, the pending patent application relating to the platform, various trademarks, and holds licensing relationships necessary to deliver the project. Ulysses "Seen" is a 2012 graphic novel by Robert Berry. It is an adaptation of James Joyce's Ulysses. The project is expected to take ten years to complete.

Originally developed as an online comic, it was released as an iPad app in 2010. Apple asked the publisher, Throwaway Horse, to censor several panels which contravened their policy on nudity, but reversed their decision later in the year.
